Brittan Elementary School District is a school district in Sutter County, California, United States. It operates a single elementary school, Brittan Elementary School.

References

External links 
 

School districts in Sutter County, California